Loxaspilates nakajimai is a moth in the family Geometridae first described by Inoue in 1983. It is found in Taiwan.

References

Moths described in 1983
Ennominae